Catriel Iván Víctor Orcellet (born 10 May 1978) is an Argentine former professional footballer who last played as goalkeeper for Gimnasia y Esgrima.

References

1978 births
Living people
Sportspeople from Entre Ríos Province
Argentine footballers
Association football goalkeepers
Argentine Primera División players
La Liga players
Boca Juniors footballers
Gimnasia y Esgrima de Concepción del Uruguay footballers
Nueva Chicago footballers
Club Atlético Lanús footballers
Arsenal de Sarandí footballers
Real Valladolid players